Ken Crawley (born February 8, 1993) is an American football cornerback who is a free agent. He played college football at Colorado. He also played for the New Orleans Saints, Miami Dolphins, and the Arizona Cardinals.

Professional career

New Orleans Saints

2016
On May 1, 2016, the New Orleans Saints signed Crawley to a three-year, $1.62 million contract as an undrafted free agent that includes a signing bonus of $5,000.

Throughout training camp, he competed for a roster spot against De'Vante Harris, Brandon Dixon, Brian Dixon, Damian Swann, Tony Carter, and Jimmy Pruitt. Crawley made a strong case for a spot on the active roster after turning in multiple impressive performances in practice while taking first team reps at outside cornerback while Keenan Lewis, Delvin Breaux, and Damian Swann were sidelined with injuries. After the release of Keenan Lewis, head coach Sean Payton named Crawley the third cornerback on the depth chart behind starters Delvin Breaux and P. J. Williams.

He made his professional regular season debut in the New Orleans Saints' season-opener against the Oakland Raiders and recorded four solo tackles during their 35–34 loss. The following week, Crawley collected six combined tackles, deflected a pass, and forced the first fumble of his career as the Saints lost 16–13 at the New York Giants. During the first quarter, De'Vante Harris recovered the fumble after Crawley caused a fumble while tackling Giants' receiver Victor Cruz with teammate Jairus Byrd. On September 26, 2016, Crawley made his first career start after P. J. Williams was placed on injured reserve after suffering a serious concussion the week before. Crawley finished the Saints' 45–32 loss against the Atlanta Falcons with four solo tackles and two pass deflections. In Week 4, he made a season-high seven combined tackles and a pass deflection during their 35–34 win at the San Diego Chargers. Prior to Week 9, Crawley was demoted to a reserve role behind Sterling Moore and B. W. Webb. On December 28, 2016, Crawley suffered a dislocated knee in practice and was ruled inactive for the Saints' Week 17 matchup against the Atlanta Falcons. Williams finished his rookie season with 43 combined tackles (40 solo), eight pass deflections, a forced fumble, and a fumble recovery in 15 games and five starts.

2017
Crawley entered training camp competing for the job as the third cornerback on the depth chart against Sterling Moore and rookie Marshon Lattimore. Head coach Sean Payton named Crawley the starting cornerback alongside P. J. Williams after Delvin Breaux suffered a fractured fibula.
 
Crawley was inactive for the first two games (Weeks 1–2). On September 24, 2017, he started his first game of the season and recorded a season-high eight combined tackles and a pass deflection. In Week 3, Crawley made four solo tackles, two deflected passes, and made his first career interception off a pass attempt by Jay Cutler during the Saints' 20–0 victory against the Miami Dolphins. He was inactive for the Saints' Week 12 matchup at the Los Angeles Rams due to a strained oblique.
He finished the  season 54 combined tackles (47 solo), 17 pass deflections, and an interception in 13 games and 13 starts. He finished second on the team in pass deflections behind rookie Marshon Lattimore. He received an overall grade of 81.6 from Pro Football Focus, which was the 39th highest grade among cornerbacks.

The New Orleans Saints finished first in the NFC South with an 11–5 record. On January 7, 2018, Crawley started his first career playoff game and recorded seven combined tackles and a pass deflection in the Saints' 31–26 victory against the Carolina Panthers in the NFC Wildcard game. The following week, he had six combined tackles as New Orleans lost 29–24 at the Minnesota Vikings. Crawley was flagged for pass interference on two consecutive plays in the first quarter. The two penalties combined for 54-yards and led to a field goal for the Minnesota Vikings. He was also on the receiving end of a missed tackle by fellow free safety Marcus Williams that knocked him over when the latter was attempting to tackle an airborne Stefon Diggs on the final play of the game, which prevented both of them from having a chance to tackle Diggs. Diggs, in turn, was able to score a touchdown on that play to win the game for Minnesota.

2018
Crawley entered training camp stated as a starting cornerback. Head coach Sean Payton named Crawley and Marshon Lattimore the starting cornerbacks to begin the regular season, alongside nickelback Patrick Robinson.

2019
On October 29, 2019, Crawley was released by the Saints.

Miami Dolphins
On October 30, 2019, Crawley was claimed off waivers by the Miami Dolphins. He was waived/injured on December 4, 2019 and placed on injured reserve. He was released on December 16.

Las Vegas Raiders
On January 23, 2020, Crawley was signed by the Las Vegas Raiders to a reserve/future contract. He was released on August 18, 2020.

Arizona Cardinals 
On August 21, 2020, Crawley was signed by the Arizona Cardinals. On September 5, 2020, Crawley was released during final roster cuts.

New Orleans Saints (second stint)
On September 28, 2020, Crawley was signed to the New Orleans Saints practice squad. He was elevated to the active roster on October 3 for the team's week 4 game against the Detroit Lions, and reverted to the practice squad after the game. He was promoted to the active roster on October 12, 2020. He was placed on the reserve/COVID-19 list by the team on October 23, and activated on October 28. In Week 17 against the Carolina Panthers, Crawley recorded his first interception of the season off a pass thrown by P. J. Walker during the 33–7 win.

On May 17, 2021, Crawley re-signed with the Saints. He was placed on injured reserve on September 10, 2021. He was activated on November 13. He was waived on November 20. He was re-signed three days later.

San Francisco 49ers
On August 10, 2022, Crawley signed with the San Francisco 49ers. He was released on August 29.

References

External links
 Las Vegas Raiders bio
 New Orleans Saints bio
 Colorado Buffaloes bio

1993 births
Living people
Players of American football from Washington, D.C.
H. D. Woodson High School alumni
American football cornerbacks
Colorado Buffaloes football players
New Orleans Saints players
Miami Dolphins players
Las Vegas Raiders players
Arizona Cardinals players
San Francisco 49ers players